The Chișer is a small river in Arad County, Romania. Formerly a left tributary of the river Crișul Alb, it now discharges into the Canalul Morilor, which flows parallel to the south of the Crișul Alb. The former lower course of the Chișer is now the Valea Nouă Chișer.

References

Rivers of Romania
Rivers of Arad County